Cokesbury is the official retail division of the United Methodist Publishing house.

Cokesbury may also refer to:

Locations
Cokesbury, Maryland
Cokesbury, New Jersey
Cokesbury, North Carolina
Cokesbury, South Carolina

Institutions
Cokesbury Church, located in Virginia
Cokesbury College, defunct college in Maryland